Bachche Kachche Sachche is an Indian drama film directed by Ravi Sadasiv and starring Ashish Vidyarthi and Mukesh Tiwari. It was released on 9 June 2017. It follows the theme of adults showing disregard for civil manners in front of children.

Cast
Anna hazare as Anna hazare
Ashish Vidyarthi as Munna
Mukesh Tiwari as Rana 
Dr. Ashvini kumar singh as T.V. reporter

References

External links
 
 

2017 films